The R-type calcium channel is a type of voltage-dependent calcium channel. Like the others of this class, the α1 subunit forms the pore through which calcium enters the cell and determines most of the channel's properties. This α1 subunit is also known as the calcium channel, voltage-dependent, R type, alpha 1E subunit (CACNA1E) or Cav2.3 which in humans is encoded by the CACNA1E gene.
They are strongly expressed in cortex, hippocampus, striatum, amygdala and interpeduncular nucleus.

They are poorly understood, but like Q-type calcium channels, they appear to be present in cerebellar granule cells. They have a high threshold of activation and relatively slow kinetics.

References

Further reading

External links 
 
 

Ion channels
Electrophysiology
Integral membrane proteins
Calcium channels